This is a list of 20th-century battles involving the Ottoman Empire prior to World War I; for World War I battles, see List of Ottoman battles in World War I.

The table
Blue in the following table represents naval engagement.

See also
 List of battles involving the Ottoman Empire
 List of Ottoman battles in World War I
 List of battles of the Turkish War of Independence

+
+
Battles of the Italo-Turkish War
Battles involving the Ottoman Empire